James Bogle (born 1959) is an Australian director and writer of films and TV.

Select Credits
Kadaicha (1988)
Mad Bomber in Love (1992)
In the Winter Dark (1998)
Closed for Winter (2009)

References

External links

Australian film directors
1959 births
Living people
Australian television directors
Australian television writers
Australian screenwriters
Australian male television writers
Australian male screenwriters
Australian male writers